Escondido Bible College (EBC) was founded in Escondido, California, in 1983 as Cathedral Bible College by Dr. Coleman and Mary Phillips. And Reverend Dr. George and Jean Simmons. Its name was changed to Escondido Bible College, following the renaming of its patron church, Cathedral of the Valley, to Escondido Christian Center.  In the mid-2000s its present name was adopted.  EBC is associated with the International Church of the Foursquare Gospel (ICFG).

Faculty 
In addition to its founder Coleman Phillips, past faculty have included (Original Dean 1983-1989) Reverend Dr. George Simmons, Reverend and Navy Chaplain Dr. Hugh Brom, Family Therapist Mari Blevins, Attorney Dana Robinson (Dean '93-'96), Rev. John "Skip" Hawks (Dean '96-2000), Escondido Christian Schools former Assistant Superintendent Pat Klose, and Learning to Love Program Director John Guerrieri.

Accreditation and Degrees  
EBC has granted degrees with a theological emphasis under section 9410c of the state of California, Department of private, postsecondary and vocational Education. For the majority of its existence, until recently, the school was accredited by Accrediting Commission International. The college formerly held a matriculation agreement with Azusa Pacific University.

EBC has offered various degrees, including a two-year A.A. and 2 four-year Bachelor of Arts degrees: Biblical Studies and Transformational Ministry Majors, a two-year Bachelor of Theology, and an 18-month degree completion Bachelor of Arts in Ministry and Leadership. For those who had already possessed an accredited B.A. or B.S., a master's level program in Strategic Leadership with an emphasis in ministry has been made available.

Current Status  
EBC currently acts as a training school for laity of Escondido Christian Center (The Center).  Classes are focused on facilitating the ministry of this particular church, assuming more of a denominational perspective in its offerings.  Currently students who attend work towards a Certificate of Ministry to aid in their functions within the church and ministries beyond.

External links 
 

Association for Biblical Higher Education
The Foursquare Church
Bible colleges
Pentecostalism in California
Education in Escondido, California